Romuald Wadagni (born 20 June 1976) is Benin's Minister of Economy, Finance and Denationalization Programs. He replaces Komi Koutché in this position. After 17 years of ascension within the French (Paris and Lyon), American (Boston and New York) and African (Kinshasa and Lubumbashi) firms of the consulting firm Deloitte, he was appointed on 7 April 2016, Minister of Economy and Finance in the first Talon government, a position to which he was reappointed in 2021.

Biography

Studies 
Romuald Wadagni was born in Benin in 1976. After obtaining a scientific baccalaureate in Benin, he continued his studies in France. From 1995 to 1999, he studied at the École supérieure des affaires de Grenoble (ESA) where he obtained a Master's degree in Finance. During his studies in Grenoble, he met a partner from Deloitte who identified his potential and recruited him into the consulting firm in 1998.

Career

Career path 
At the end of his studies, Wadagni joined the Deloitte office in Lyon where he stayed for four years and became supervisor.

In 2003, he obtained the U.S. Certified Public Accountant, and left France to join the United States. In Boston, he joined the Deloitte office as an Audit Manager. He stayed there for 3 years, until 2006. He worked for large companies such as Orange, and was involved in acquisitions and mergers. In 2007, he attended the Harvard Business School and obtained a degree in Private Equity and Venture Capital.

He was promoted partner of the firm in 2012, at the age of 36, thanks to his expertise, his network, his multicultural profile and his knowledge of the American and French systems. He participated in the structuring of Deloitte's activities in the zone, which in 2012 included Ivory Coast, Senegal, Benin, Gabon, Congo, Equatorial Guinea, the Democratic Republic of Congo, Morocco, Algeria and Tunisia.

In the RDC, he founded the Deloitte offices in Kinshasa and Lubumbashi in 2012. As Director of Professional Practice on the African continent, Romuald Wadagni ensured that international standards were applied by the entire Deloitte network in Francophone Africa. In November 2015, he was appointed Head of Audit Francophone Africa.

In 2015, he re-enrolled at Harvard and was graduated a MBA.

In 2016, he has 17 years of expertise in French (Paris and Lyon), American (Boston and New York) and African (Lubumbashi) firms of Deloitte. He is recognized for his expertise in IFRS, US GAAP conversion assignment missions, offerings type transactions (IPO, fund-raising, etc.) as well as in the restructuring of public and private companies.

Political career 
On 7 April 2016, Wadagni was appointed Minister of Economy and Finance in the first Talon government.

Faced with a country weakened by debt, he made the consolidation of public finances his priority, in order to make Benin credible to international public and private donors. He promoted a proactive debt management policy and made successful exits on the international financial market. The credibility gained by honoring its commitments allowed the country to borrow on a very long-term basis and at rates lower than other countries in the region, such as Ivory Coast and Senegal.

In October 2018, he completed a €260 million loan for Benin on the international markets. This is a first for the country.

On 12 January 2021, Benin issued two Eurobonds. The first, for 11 years, at a rate of 4.9%, for an amount of 700 million euros. A second, over 31 years, with a rate of 6.9%, for an amount of 300 million euros. With this operation, Benin joined the limited number of emerging issuers to have a euro-denominated Eurobond with a maturity of more than 30 years.

Following Benin's good performance despite the Covid-19 crisis, the rating agency Moody's upgraded the country's rating in March 2021 from B2 with a positive outlook to B1 with a stable outlook. This rating reflects the success of the debt management carried out by Romuald Wadagni. In April 2022, Fitch Ratings maintained the B+ rating, with a stable outlook.

In July 2021, Benin will carry out a major operation by becoming the first African country to issue a Eurobond dedicated to the financing of projects with a high impact on the achievement of the United Nations Sustainable Development Goals, for an amount of 328 billion CFA francs (500 million euros) and an interest rate of 4.9%. This operation follows several months of work by Romuald Wadagni and his team, and trips to meet investors in Asia, Europe and America.

On 29 November 2021, the country repaid part of its debt early, finalizing the early redemption of a CFA 218 billion (€332 million) bond tranche on BRVM, including more than CFA 150 billion in bonds issued through public offerings. With this operation, Benin saved more than 36 billion CFA francs (about 55 million euros) in non-accrued interest, which were directly injected into various social impact projects. Following this operation, the magazine Jeune Afrique published an article entitled "How Romuald Wadagni made Cotonou save 55 million euros".

During the Covid-19 pandemic, Benin's economy showed resilience. Benin was among the three countries with the highest growth rate in sub-Saharan Africa in 2020 (about 3.8%), with a rebound to 7.2% in 2021 and an estimated average of 6.4% over the 2022-2026 period.

Romuald Wadagni also works to promote the private sector and entrepreneurship. In 2020, Benin became the country in the world where it was easier and quicker to start a business according to the United Nations Conference on Trade and Development (UNCTAD).

In May 2021, Patrice Talon reappointed him as Minister of Economy, Finance and Denationalization Programs.

In December 2021, Wadagni was named the best African Minister of Economy and Finance by Financial Afrik. He is present in the short list of the ranking for the fourth consecutive year.

In March 2022, following the appointment of Patrice Talon as head of UEMOA, he was retained in his position as president of the UEMOA Conference of Ministers of Economy and Finance. This new synchronization between the current president of UEMOA and the president of the Conference of Ministers of Economy and Finance is the first reform of the organization under Patrice Talon.

In 2022, in the context of the economic crisis following the COVID-19 pandemic and the Russian-Ukrainian war, Wadagni took measures to preserve the purchasing power of Beninese. The authorities have announced that they will invest more than 41 billion CFA francs (US$66 million) in reducing the prices of consumer goods.

References

Living people
1976 births
21st-century Beninese politicians
Finance ministers of Benin
Harvard Business School alumni
People from Mono Department